Le Potentiel is a Democratic Republic of the Congo daily newspaper published by award-winning journalist Modeste Mutinga. The Committee to Protect Journalists described it as "the only independent daily newspaper in the war-torn Democratic Republic of Congo". According to Mutinga, the paper has "an agenda" of promoting economic development and democracy.

The paper criticized multiple DRC presidents, and Mutinga has been threatened, arrested, and jailed multiple times on charges related to his reporting. In 1992, during the Mobutu Sese Seko era, the offices of the newspaper were bombed. In 1998, Mutinga was arrested following an article covering the house arrest of opposition leader Etienne Tshisekedi.

See also
 Media of the Democratic Republic of the Congo

References

External links
Le Potentiel website

Newspapers published in the Democratic Republic of the Congo